Namak Issk Ka ( Salt of love) is an Indian drama television series that premiered on Colors TV on 7 December 2020. Produced by Gul Khan and Deepti Kalwani under 4 Lions Films, it starred Shruti Sharma, Aditya Ojha and Monalisa in lead roles. Principal photography ended on 13 August 2021. The show telecast its last episode on 20 August 2021 and was replaced by Nima Denzongpa.

On 26 September 2021, it premiered dubbed in Arabic under the title على قيد الحياة ( Alive) at MBC Bollywood.

Plot

Namak Issk Ka revolves around an item girl named Kahani Verma who goes by the name of Chamcham Rani and a rich businessman, Yug Pratap Rajput, who are childhood friends who became separated in an accident. Yug and Kahani meet after 15 years. This is when Yug learns that Kahani is an item girl.

Kahani is shown to have adopted two orphans and works hard to support them. Yug hates Kahani as he considers all dancers to be home-breakers who just want to lure rich people for money. Though other members of the family do not believe Kahani to be such, Yug insults her and throws her out of the house when he learns that it was her all along who was nurse to Ravikant, Yug's father's friend and Kahani's biological father. It is revealed that Iravati, Ravikant's second wife caused the accident 15 years ago which left Ravikant paralyzed an Meera dead, now separated Kahani from her family.

Yug's opinion towards Kahani changes when she saves Rupa, Yug's sister-in-law and Kahani's step-sister from a bullet, intended to kill her so as to blackmail Iravati. Yug's brother Raunak lusts for Kahani while pulling off a facade of a loving husband to a scared Rupa, even he has a son also named Harsh. He somehow convinces her to marry him while keeping her in dark that he is Yug's brother and Rupa's husband, he tells her that his first wife died, but Kahani comes to Raunak's truth. Raunak kidnaps Kahani's Brother Lucky and force her to marry him. Yug tries to prevent Kahani and Raunak from marrying. Rupa learns the truth and tries to commit suicide but is saved by Yug. For Raunak's happiness, Rupa plans to do the wedding of Raunak and Kahani secretly with Yug and Gunjan's marriage. But Yug comes to know the secret that Kahani is disguised as Rupa. Soon he reveals this to everybody. After a shocking turn of events, Kahani becomes the epicentre of the family's condemnation and rejection when the series of events force Yug to marry her. However, she stands up against the family for insulting her and declares to leave the house for good. Despite her efforts, Kahani fails to escape Yug's clutches. Soon, she attacks Yug and rushes to meet Rani and Lucky. However, Kahani notices the lock Yug gave her in their childhood and realises that he is her long-lost friend. Iravati tries to console Gunjan after her wedding to Yug is jeopardised. But Gunjan lashes out at her and reveals knowing about her attempt to murder Ravikant. However, a cunning Iravati changes tact and convinces Gunjan to change her opinion. As Kahani is being treated unfairly by the whole family, she hopes to tell Yug the truth and seek his trust. However, Yug tells Kahani that he has nothing but deep-rooted hatred for her.

Cast

Main
Shruti Sharma as
Kahani Yug Pratap Rajput (née Verma) / Chamcham Rani
Satya Singh Verma
Aditya Ojha as Yug Pratap Rajput
Monalisa as Iravati Verma

Recurring
Rajshri Rani as Rupa Raunak Pratap Rajput
Aamir S Khan as Raunak "Ronny" Pratap Rajput
Garima Vikrant Singh as Saroj Rajput
Anjalie Gupta as Meera Verma
Muzaffar Khan as Ravikant Verma
Zoya Humayuh as Rani
Unknown as Meera Singh Rathod
Ayansh Mishra as Harsh Rajput
Drishti Thakur as Juhi Rajput
Meena Naithani as Amba Rajput
Sheetal Tiwari as Gunjan Verma
Arjun Aneja as Karan
Golo Morea as Dolly
Nikhil Mehta as Patanga
Jaswant Menaria as Shailendra Thakur

Special appearances
 Sidharth Shukla as himself (2021)
 Rakhi Sawant as herself (2021)
 Lalit Singh as Friend: Holi Sequence (2021)
 Rubina Dilaik as Soumya Singh from Shakti - Astitva Ke Ehsaas Ki (2021)
 Dipika Kakar Ibrahim as Simar Prem Bharadwaj to promote Sasural Simar Ka 2 (2021)
 Pravisht Mishra as Anirudh Roy Chaudhary from Barrister Babu (2021)
 Aurra Bhatnagar Badoni as Bondita Anirudh Roy Chaudhary from Barrister Babu (2021)
 Ankit Gupta as Fateh Singh Virk from Udaariyaan (2021)
 Isha Malviya as Jasmin Kaur Sandhu from Udaariyaan (2021)
 Priyal Mahajan as Purvi Virendra Pratap Singh from Molkki (2021)
 Amar Upadhyay as Virendra Pratap Singh from Molkki (2021)
 Priyanka Choudhary as Tejo Kaur Sandhu from Udaariyaan (2021)
 Ankit Gupta as Fateh Singh Virk from Udaariyaan (2021)
 Isha Malviya as Jasmin Kaur Sandhu from Udaariyaan (2021) Tejo Kaur Sandhu from Udaariyaan (2021)
 Avinesh Rekhi as Sarabjeet Singh Gill from Choti Sarrdaarni (2021)
 Aekam Binjwa as Paramjeet Singh Gill from Choti Sarrdaarni (2021)
 Kevina Tak as Seher Kaur Gill from Choti Sarrdaarni (2021)
 Sahil Uppal as Omkar Shukla from Pinjara Khoobsurti Ka (2021)
 Riya Sharma as Mayura Shukla from Pinjara Khoobsurti Ka (2021)
 Aditya Redij as Shiva Lashkare from Bawara Dil (2021)
 Kinjal Dhamecha as Siddhi Lashkare from Bawara Dil (2021)

References

External links
 
 Namak Issk Ka on Voot

2020 Indian television series debuts
Hindi-language television shows
Indian drama television series
Indian television soap operas